West Frisian can refer to:

 The West Frisian branch of the Frisian languages, spoken in the Friesland province of the Netherlands.
 Something of or relating to the West Frisia territory in the Netherlands.
 Something of or relating to the West Friesland region of the Netherlands.
 The West Frisian dialect of Dutch, spoken in the North Holland province of the Netherlands.
 West Frisians, people of the Netherlands.

See also 
 Frisian (disambiguation)

Language and nationality disambiguation pages